The Trenton–Morrisville Toll Bridge is one of three road bridges connecting Trenton, New Jersey with Morrisville, Pennsylvania. Opened on December 1, 1952, it carries U.S. Route 1 (US 1) and is owned and operated by the Delaware River Joint Toll Bridge Commission.

Construction of the bridge took two years to complete, and cost $6,650,000.

History and architectural features
Opened to traffic on December 1, 1952, following brief ribbon-cutting ceremonies that were conducted on the bridge and presided over by Henry T. Shelly, a vice president of the Delaware River Joint Toll Bridge Commission and former mayor of Milford, New Jersey, the new Trenton-Morrisville Toll Bridge was first crossed by automobiles driven by a railroad conductor and a salesman, Joseph E. Wooley, of Bristol, Pennsylvania.

This bridge's toll plaza was originally configured to collect tolls from both the northbound and southbound travel lanes. Today, tolls are collected only from vehicles travelling southbound (entering Pennsylvania/leaving New Jersey).

Beginning in 2006, the Trenton–Morrisville Toll Bridge underwent renovation work to expand and rehabilitate the bridge and auxiliary structures. Improvements included the addition of a third northbound lane on the main bridge, installing a new soundwall along Northbound US 1 in Pennsylvania as well as lengthening deceleration lanes. This $67 million project was designed by the Louis Berger Group and awarded to Conti Enterprises Incorporated, and concluded in 2009.

See also
 
 
 
 
 List of crossings of the Delaware River

References

External links

 Delaware River Joint Toll Bridge Commission - Trenton-Morrisville Toll Bridge

Delaware River Joint Toll Bridge Commission
1952 establishments in New Jersey
1952 establishments in Pennsylvania
Toll bridges in New Jersey
Toll bridges in Pennsylvania
Buildings and structures in Trenton, New Jersey
Bridges over the Delaware River
U.S. Route 1
Bridges completed in 1952
Bridges in Bucks County, Pennsylvania
Bridges in Mercer County, New Jersey
Road bridges in New Jersey
Road bridges in Pennsylvania
Bridges of the United States Numbered Highway System
Interstate vehicle bridges in the United States